The 2012 Vanderbilt Commodores football team represented Vanderbilt University during the 2012 NCAA Division I FBS football season. The Commodores played their six home games at Vanderbilt Stadium at Dudley Field in Nashville, Tennessee, which has been Vanderbilt football's home stadium since 1922.  The team's head coach was James Franklin, who is in his second year at Vanderbilt. Vanderbilt has been a member of the Southeastern Conference (SEC) since the league's inception in 1932, and has participated in the conference's Eastern Division since its formation for the 1992 season. On November 11, 2012 Vandy became bowl eligible in back to back years for the first time in its 123-year football history. This was the first time since 1935 that Vandy won five SEC games in a year and the first time in 30 years that they won at home against Tennessee. Vanderbilt finished the year with the longest current SEC winning streak. For the first time since 1948, Vanderbilt finished the season with a top 25 ranking.

Before the season
Vanderbilt vice chancellor of athletics David Williams announced on February 6, 2012 Vanderbilt will be adding new artificial turf and a new JumboTron.

Vice Chancellor Williams confirmed that a large "berm" is to be constructed in the open end of Vanderbilt Stadium as a place for fans to watch games starting fall 2012. The project, in addition to other renovations, began after the Black & Gold scrimmage on April 14, 2012. While several ACC stadiums such as Clemson's  Memorial Stadium and Virginia's Scott Stadium  have hillside seating, Vanderbilt's idea stemmed from the team's 2011 visit to Wake Forest's BB&T Field, which features "Deacon Hill" in one end zone.

Vanderbilt's is on the line of, but not to the same as Wake Forest. Wake Forest has a natural hill, Vanderbilt's is manmade. Only 500 seats are available, the hillside is a first-come, first-served area in terms of picking a spot to sit. No lounge chairs or coolers are allowed, but fans can bring blankets to place on the grass. The berm will not reach the permanent seating on the sidelines to leave space in the corners of the end zone for fans to enter. The grass on the playing surface will be cut up and relocated to the berm. FieldTurf is being installed as the new playing surface after April 14, 2012. The JumboTron Vanderbilt is installing in the open end zone that will showcase a significantly larger screen than the one above the closed end zone.

The fourth major project set for the stadium is improved lighting. Vanderbilt Stadium has the reputation of being one of D1 college football's darker venues for night games. Renovations are ongoing at McGugin Center, where new meeting rooms and Olympic sport locker rooms are being built. The work is due for completion summer 2012.

On July 12, 2012, Vanderbilt announced that vice chancellor David Williams will change his title to vice chancellor for athletes and university affairs and athletics director. This will be the first time Vanderbilt has had an athletics director since 2003.

2012 season milestones
In 2012 Franklin's team has had numerous milestones.

 The longest road winning streak (4) since 1950  
 Longest win streak (7) since 1948.
 Most times scoring 40 (5) or more points since 1915.
 First Vandy player (Zac Stacy) to rush for over 3,000 yards in career
 First time since 1949–1951 that Vanderbilt beats Rival Ole Miss in consecutive years. 
 Jordan Matthews set a single-season record with 1,262 yards receiving.
 Kicker Carey Spear school record 81 points.
 Largest margin of victory over Rival Tennessee (23) 41-18 since 1954 (26-0)
 Largest margin of victory against secondary rival Kentucky (40) since 1916 when Vanderbilt won 45-0
 First time a Vanderbilt team to a bowl in back to back years 
 First win at home vs Tennessee in 30 years
 First 8 win season since 1982
 Longest rush from scrimmage 90 Zac Stacy. 
 First winning record in the regular season since 1982
 Four straight wins in SEC play for the first time since 1949
 The first time in Vanderbilt history a player (Zac Stacy) has rushed for over 1,000 yards back to back years.
 The first 9 win season since 1915

New uniforms
On July 11, 2012 Vanderbilt unveiled new football uniforms. Marking the first time since the 1986 season Vanderbilt added a white helmet. Other changes are to the gold jersey, with the addition of black shoulder covering and numbers. Also Vanderbilt is on the front of all jerseys and Names on the back. A Star V logo is on both sides of the paints (before was only on one side). A gold anchor is in the center of the jersey collar. The words Anchor Down (the team's motto) is placed on the inside of the collar. Vanderbilt has 27 uniform combinations for the 2012 season. For the opener against South Carolina on August 30, 2012, the team wore all black.

Maryland transfers
On February 18, 2012 Maryland Football coach Randy Edsall blocked three of his players from transferring to Vanderbilt. Quarterback Danny O’Brien, offensive tackle Max Garcia and linebacker Mario Rowson. Franklin was instrumental in O’Brien's recruitment out of North Carolina, and the two shared a close relationship before Franklin's departure to become the head coach at Vanderbilt in December 2010. Edsall's transfer policy does not allow former players to transfer to other ACC schools or upcoming opponents outside the conference.

On February 22, 2012 Edsall changed his mind and said he will allow three football players to transfer to Vanderbilt, if they wish.

On February 22, 2012 Maryland officially filed tampering charges against Vanderbilt: "We have been informed by the Southeastern Conference that the Atlantic Coast Conference has filed a formal complaint involving Vanderbilt University football on behalf of one of its members. We are complying with SEC and Vanderbilt procedures and are conducting an investigation on the matter."

Maryland has believed strongly that O’Brien had been in contact with former Maryland offensive coordinator James Franklin, now Vanderbilt's coach. Under NCAA rules, a school can limit a rival program from having contact with a player without permission: "A rival school can't encourage a player to transfer without permission. And it can't provide athletics aid in the first academic year if the player transfers without that consent."

Franklin has said he keeps relationships with former players but has maintained there was no tampering.

Vanderbilt vice chancellor of athletics David Williams said he will be looking thorough and will be conducting an internal investigation into whether football Coach James Franklin or anyone else on his staff was tampering with Maryland players who intend to transfer. The SEC sent a request to Vanderbilt to have the matter investigated.

Schedule

Coaching staff

Coaching changes
On January 13, 2012, Franklin announced the hiring of George Barlow, a defensive coordinator at the University of New Mexico in 2011. At Vanderbilt, he coached defensive backs and served as defensive recruiting coordinator. Josh Gattis, who helped Western Michigan to its fifth bowl game as a receivers coach in 2011, was hired at Vanderbilt as wide receiver coach and handled offensive recruiting coordinator duties.

Captains

Starters
FIRST TEAM OFFENSE

FIRST TEAM DEFENSE

SPECIAL TEAMS

+ All SEC Second Team

Recruiting
 Austyn Carta-Samuels transferred to Vanderbilt from Wyoming. He contributed as a practice squad quarterback during the 2011 regular season. In 2009, he earned postseason Mountain West Conference Freshman of the Year honors while at Wyoming.

Rankings

Game summaries

South Carolina
Vanderbilt has played South Carolina 22 times and trails 4–18 the first meeting was in 1961 USC won the first seven 1962 to 1997 Vanderbilt won 2 in 98 and 99 USC won the next seven 2000 to 2006 Vandy won the next two and USC has won the last 4. The latest game was the first game of the college football year and played on ESPN.

Northwestern
Vanderbilt has played Northwestern 4 times with a 1–2–1 record, the teams' first meeting was in 1947 Vanderbilt won 3–0, in 1962 played to a tie score at 20 and Northwestern has won the last two games 21–23 and 13–23

Presbyterian
This was the first meeting of Presbyterian and Vanderbilt. Jordan Rodgers did not play in this game.

Georgia
Secondary rival Georgia has played Vanderbilt 73 times dating back to 1893. Vanderbilt trails 18–53–2 Vandy was at one time ahead; from 1893 until 1961 Vandy was 14–9–1 from 1962 to present Vanderbilt trails with only 4 wins and 43 losses and 1 tie.

Missouri
Missouri and Vanderbilt have played 5 times in a tied series of 2–2–1 the first meeting was 1895. Vanderbilt lost the first 2 games 1895 0–14, 1896 6–26, tied the next 7–7 1957 and won 12–8 in 1958. This was the first meeting since 1958 only one of the five games has been played in Nashville 3 in Columbia, Mo. and 1 in Saint Louis.

Florida
Vanderbilt and secondary rival Florida has played 46 times and trails 9–35–2. Vanderbilt lead for only a few years from 1945 when they first met until 1963 Vandy was 6–6–1 at that point; Vanderbilt has lost the last 22 games the last two have been somewhat close most have been one sided to the Florida side Vanderbilt lost in 1993 by 52 points.

Auburn
Auburn and Vandy have met 41 time since 1893 Vandy leads by one game at 21–20–1 Vandy lost the first meeting and won the next 5, games tied 1, lost 2, won 2, lost 1, won 2, lost 1, won1, lost 1, Vandy won the next 8 Auburn won the next in 1955 Vanderbilt played in its first bowl game against Auburn Vandy won 25–13 from 1893 to 1955 Vandy and Auburn played 28 time Vandy lead 19–7–1. The teams did not play from 1956 to 1977 from 1978 to present the teams have played only 15 times Auburn won 13 straight games Vandy has won the last two. The 2008 game was a "ESPN College GameDay" game which Vandy won it made them at the time 5–0.

University of Massachusetts
UMass and Vandy is the first meeting of the schools. This was U Massachusetts first year in FBS.

Kentucky
Vanderbilt and secondary rival Kentucky have played 85 times dating back to 1896. Vanderbilt trails 40–41–4 Vandy won the first nine games from 1896 to 1918; in 1945 Vandy had a record of 19–2–1. The first 11 games Vandy did not give up a point outscoring Kentucky 267 to 0. Vandy has been shutout 7 times and has shutout Kentucky 15 times.

Ole Miss
Vandy Ole Miss Rivalry is one of the oldest in NCAA first meet in 1894. Vanderbilt trails 38–47–2. Vanderbilt won the first 16 games by shutouts, the first 19 games were won by Vandy. Vanderbilt outscored Ole Miss 566 to 14, with blowout wins in 1894 Vandy by 40, 1902 by 29, 1903, by 33, 1904, by 69, 1906 by 29, 1907, by 60, 1908 by 29, 1911, by 21, 1912, by 24, the biggest margin of defeat Ole Miss suffered was 1915 by 91, 1916 Vandy won by 35. They did not play every year until 1945 the 25 games were played in Tennessee 5 in Memphis and 20 in Nashville. 1948 the first game was played in Oxford, Vandy lost 7–20.  From 1955 to 1962 Ole Miss shutout Vandy 7 times from 1945 to 1967 they played 20 years in a row Vandys record was 5–15–2. Since 1970 Vandy and Ole Miss has played every year (43 times), Vandy is 13–30–0. Since 2005 Vandy has won 6 games and the last 3 is the longest for Vandy since 1949 to 1951. The scoring has almost evened out through the years as Vandy has 1556 = 17.9 ppg and Ole Miss with 1610 = 18.5 ppg.

Tennessee
Vanderbilt and rival Tennessee have played 107 games first meeting was 1892 playing most every year from 1900 only missing only a few years, however since 1945 they have played every year (68 times). Vandy trails 29–73–5. In 1927 Vandy was 19–2–3 since the Vols has taken over with a record of 59–8–2. Vanderbilt has been shut out 22 times and shut out UT 15 games. The most points for Vandy is (76) 1913 76-0 and UT's most points is (65) 1994 Vandy lost 0–65 the year before Vandy lost 14–62. The game on November 17, 2012, was the first time that Vanderbilt beat UT at home in 30 years. The Vanderbilt win was the largest margin of victory in the series since 1954 when Vandy won 26–0.

Wake Forest
Wake Forest and Vanderbilt have played 14 times. Vandy leads 8–6, and the first meeting was in 1964.

NC State

References

Vanderbilt
Vanderbilt Commodores football seasons
Music City Bowl champion seasons
Vanderbilt Commodores football